Zawonia  (1936-45 Blüchertal) is a village in Trzebnica County, Lower Silesian Voivodeship, in south-western Poland. It is the seat of the administrative district (gmina) called Gmina Zawonia.

References

Zawonia